Television: A Challenge to the Psychoanalytic Establishment is the 1990 English-language translation of Jacques Lacan's text "Télévision" accompanied by a "Dossier on the Institutional Debate". The single volume thus includes two distinct projects which were separately translated.

Lacan's "Television"

In 1973, the film maker Benoît Jacquot approached Jacques Lacan via Jacques-Alain Miller with the idea of making a film on Lacan and his teaching. Lacan soon agreed to the project, which ultimately took the form of Miller posing questions to which Lacan replied at some length in a semi-improvised manner. The final edited film, commissioned by the ORTF, was broadcast in two parts on prime-time television (8.30pm on two consecutive Saturday evenings) under the title "Psychanalyse".

The text "Télévision" is a partially re-written transcription of the filmed dialogue between Miller and Lacan, with marginalia added by the former. It was published as a small book by Éditions du Seuil, and later included in the 2001 collection Autres écrits, confirming its status as one of Lacan's "written" texts as opposed to a simple transcription of an oral delivery. Lacan added the epigraph "He who interrogates me / also knows how to read me", in reference to Jacques-Alain Miller.

The English-language translation by Denis Hollier, Rosalind Krauss and Annette Michelson was first published in Issue 40 of October Journal in 1987 under the editorship of Joan Copjec.

"A Challenge to the Psychoanalytic Establishment": Dossier on the Institutional Debate 

In January 1977, the French journal Ornicar ? edited by Jacques-Alain Miller published two supplements: on the 1953 "Scission" of the Société française de psychanalyse from the Paris Psychoanalytic Society (the French branch of the International Psychoanalytic Association); and on Lacan's 1963 "Excommunication" from the latter.

A selection of these texts, together with some key institutional material relating to Lacan's École freudienne de Paris, were translated by Jeffrey Mehlman and included in the above-mentioned October volume.

The Dossier includes:
 Lacan's 1953 Letters to his former analyst Rudolph Loewenstein and the then President of the IPA, Heinz Hartmann.
 Hartmann's Report to the XVIIIth Congress of the IPA.
 Lacan's 1960 Letter to D. W. Winnicott who had served on the first committee of the IPA evaluating the situation of the SFP.
 Lacan's single lesson titled "Introduction to the Names-of-the-Father Seminar" delivered on 20 November 1963, the day after he learnt of his definitive stripping of the title of training analyst.
 Lacan's 1964 "Founding Act" of the EFP.
 Lacan's 1980 "Letter of Dissolution" of the EFP.

This important document constitutes the fullest record of the circumstances of Lacan's stripping of the title of training analyst in 1963, including first-hand historical elements that point beyond the oft-cited issue of Lacan's variable-length sessions.

The 1990 Norton volume

In 1990, W.W. Norton & Co. re-published Issue 40 of the October journal as a hardback book. The collection includes an introductory text by Jacques-Alain Miller, "Microscopia" (translated by Bruce Fink), and an introduction to the Institutional Debate by Joan Copjec.

See also
 Seminars of Jacques Lacan
 Psychoanalytic theory

References

External links
Lacan Dot Com
Chronology of Jacques Lacan
[http://www.lacan.com/essays "How to Read Lacan], London: Granta Books, 2006.

Further reading
 Jacquot, Benoît "Comment Lacan". Le Diable probablement 9 117–126.
 Miller, Jacques-Alain "Reading a Symptom". Hurly-Burly''  6 (2011) 143–152.

Books about psychoanalysis
1990 non-fiction books
French books
Works by Jacques Lacan
W. W. Norton & Company books